Darwin Island (Spanish: Isla Darwin)  is among the smallest in the Galápagos Archipelago with an area of just . It is named in honour of English scientist Charles Darwin. With no dry landing sites, Darwin Island's main attractions are found in the Pacific Ocean, which is teeming with a large variety of marine life. 
Although the island had been marked on maps and had initially been given the name Culpepper Island on Admiralty charts, the first landing on Darwin Island was not until 1964, by helicopter.

The small detached group formed by Darwin Island and Wolf Island is sometimes referred to as Darwin and Wolf or Darwin-Wolf, formerly Culpepper and Wenman.

Geology
It is situated north-west of the main Galápagos Island group on the Wolf-Darwin Lineament, which extends from the Galápagos Platform to the Galápagos Spreading Centre, a mid-ocean ridge separating the Nazca and Cocos tectonic plates. The formation of Darwin Island is different from the formation of the main Galápagos Islands. There are currently two theories on the formation of the lineament:  the first is that magma rising from the mantle plume forming the main Galápagos Islands has been channelled towards the Galápagos Spreading Centre; alternatively there has been a separate rise in magma caused by stress in the ocean lithosphere by a transform fault.

Darwin Island is the most northerly of the two peaks on the Wolf Darwin Lineament that reach above the surface. The volcano that forms the island is extinct, with the last eruption believed to have been approximately 400,000 years ago, making it younger than Wolf. The lava flows around Darwin are homogenous, apparently because of its young age, and they have a similar chemical composition to those of the Galápagos Spreading Centre.

Darwin is believed to have had at least two eruptive periods in its history, depositing two tuff layers separated by plagioclase ultraphyric basalt.  Evidence also exists to suggest that Darwin Island is the remains of what was once a much larger edifice.  Since the eruptive phase this would have been eroded.

Darwin's Arch, a natural rock arch which would at one time have been part of this larger structure, was located less than a kilometre from the main Darwin Island, and it was a landmark well known to the island's few visitors, until its collapse in May 2021.

Wildlife
Darwin Island is not open to land visits. As a result, the only visitors are those that come to scuba dive, even here due to the distance from the main island only a limited number of liveaboard ships cruise here.
The marine life at Darwin is diverse with large schools of fish.  The island's waters attract whale sharks from June to November, as well as hammerhead, Galápagos, silky and blacktip sharks.  In addition green turtles, manta rays and dolphins can be found.

The island also supports a large bird population, including frigatebirds, red-footed boobies and the vampire finch.

References

External links

Darwin Island – govisitgalapagos.com

Islands of the Galápagos Islands
Charles Darwin